This is a list of Catholic churches in Tunisia. The churches are mentioned in the modus vivendi signed between Vatican and the Tunisian government on 10 July 1956.

Other churches

References 

Lists of churches
Churches in Tunisia
Catholic churches

Archdiocese of Carthage